Watcharakorn Klaitin (Thai วัชรากร ไกลถิ่น) is a Thai retired footballer.

External links
Profile at Thaipremierleague.co.th

1986 births
Living people
Watcharakorn Klaitin
Association football forwards
Watcharakorn Klaitin
Watcharakorn Klaitin
Watcharakorn Klaitin